The Heights of Abraham is a tourist attraction in Matlock Bath, Derbyshire, England. It consists of a hilltop park on top of Masson Hill, accessed from the village by either the Heights of Abraham cable car or a steep zig-zag path. The heights are named after a supposed resemblance to the Plains of Abraham, also known as the Heights of Abraham, in Quebec, Canada, where James Wolfe died in battle.

Amongst the attractions in the park, which has been open since Victorian times, are cavern and mine tours. There are also views of the dramatic scenery of the valley of the River Derwent. The cable car was opened in 1984 to provide easier access.

The Heights of Abraham are listed as grade II* in the register of historic parks and gardens of special historic interest in England.

Attractions 

There are two caves at the Heights of Abraham, the Great Masson Cavern and the Great Rutland Cavern, both previously mined for Lead ore and Fluorspar. It is thought that lead mining in this area began in Roman times and reached its peak in the 1700s. As deposits began to dwindle, and cheaper lead was imported in the 1800s, the miners found a far more lucrative use for the caves as tourist attractions; in the process of excavation a large network of caverns and passageways were created which wealthy visitors would now pay to see. There are regular guided tours to retrace the miner's footsteps with a nearby exhibition of photography, fossils and an information film, explaining the cave's history.

The Victoria Prospect Tower was built in 1844 to celebrate the reign of Queen Victoria. From the top of the tower, and from the adjacent amphitheatre, there are panoramic views of the valley of the River Derwent, the spa town of Matlock Bath and the nearby Riber Castle and Willersley Castle. A more modern viewing platform is Tinker's Shaft, which provides valley views as well as a vertical view into the Great Masson Cavern. A view from a different perspective can be obtained from the cable car, as it ascends and descends across the valley to a terminal on the far bank of the river.

The site is home to the Vista restaurant/bar, the terrace cafe and an ice-cream parlour. There is also a shop specialising in the sale of rock- and mineral-themed items.

Access 

Access to the Heights of Abraham is either on foot, via a steep footpath from Matlock Bath, or by the cable car. The lower station of the cable car is located on the opposite bank of the River Derwent to the Heights of Abraham and the town of Matlock Bath, with the cabins crossing the river at the lower end of their journey. A footbridge provides access from the town to the lower station, which is also a short walk away from Matlock Bath railway station.

The site is privately run, and an admission charge is levied on foot visitors and included in the cable car fare. The admission charge covers admission to all the attractions and cave tours. The site is open every day from late March to early November, and on various other days. Opening times are 10:00 to 16.30, and later during holidays.

References

External links 

Official site
Heights of Abraham photographs

Parks and open spaces in Derbyshire
Tourist attractions in Derbyshire
Tourist attractions of the Peak District
Grade II* listed parks and gardens in Derbyshire